Lone Tree City Center station is a light rail station in Lone Tree, Colorado, part of the Regional Transportation District (RTD) system in the Denver metropolitan area. It is served by two lines: the E Line to Union Station and the R Line to Aurora. However, the R Line currently terminates at Lincoln station due to low ridership in this area of Lone Tree which is still under construction and amid generally lower ridership due to the impact of the COVID-19 pandemic on public transport.

This station was built as part of the  Southeast Rail Extension to RidgeGate, which began in 2016 and cost $223 million. It opened on May 17, 2019.

The station sits in greenfield land that is planned to host a transit-oriented development that is connected between the three stations. The  Lone Tree City Center, for which the station is named, is planned to include 10,000 homes, office space, and parks. The development project was approved in 2018 and is planned to take decades to finish.

References 

RTD light rail stations
Transportation buildings and structures in Douglas County, Colorado
Railway stations in the United States opened in 2019